Edgardo Andrés Schetino Yancev (born 26 May 1994) is a Uruguayan footballer who plays as a central midfielder for Centro Atlético Fénix.

Club career

Fénix
Born in Montevideo, Schetino is a youth exponent from Club Atlético Fénix. On 17 August 2013 he made his professional – and Primera División – debut, starting in a 1–2 home loss against El Tanque Sisley.

Schetino scored his first goal as a professional on 29 March 2015, but in a 1–2 home loss against River Plate. He added another on 6 June, in a 3–0 home win against Cerro.

Fiorentina
In November 2015, Schetino agreed to a move to Fiorentina for a fee of €3.5 million. He signed a contract with Viola on 22 January 2016, being loaned to Livorno six days later.

On 29 July 2016, after making no appearances during the second half of the season, Schetino signed a one-year loan deal with Sevilla Atlético, newly promoted to Segunda División.

On 9 August 2018, Schetino joined to Serie B club Cosenza on loan until 30 June 2019.

Honours
Uruguay U23
Pan American Games: 2015

References

External links

1994 births
Living people
Footballers from Montevideo
Uruguayan footballers
Uruguayan expatriate footballers
Association football midfielders
Uruguayan Primera División players
Segunda División players
Danish 1st Division players
Serie B players
Centro Atlético Fénix players
ACF Fiorentina players
U.S. Livorno 1915 players
Esbjerg fB players
Sevilla Atlético players
Cosenza Calcio players
Uruguay youth international footballers
Pan American Games gold medalists for Uruguay
Footballers at the 2015 Pan American Games
Pan American Games medalists in football
Uruguayan expatriate sportspeople in Italy
Uruguayan expatriate sportspeople in Spain
Uruguayan expatriate sportspeople in Denmark
Expatriate footballers in Italy
Expatriate footballers in Spain
Expatriate men's footballers in Denmark
Medalists at the 2015 Pan American Games